Asan Memorial College of Engineering and Technology is a College of Engineering that is located in Thandarai, Chengalpattu, Kancheepuram, Tamil Nadu

Private engineering colleges in Tamil Nadu
Engineering colleges in Chennai